The Mysterious Desperado is a 1949 American Western film. The Los Angeles Times reported that "Tim Holt Westerns have attained a good standard which is adequately maintained" in the film.

Plot
Tim Holt and his partner, Chito Rafferty, investigate when Rafferty's uncle is killed and his son disappears, leaving Rafferty the possible heir to the estate.

Cast
Tim Holt as himself
Richard Martin as Chito Rafferty
Movita Castaneda as Luisa
Edward Norris as Ramon

References

External links

1949 films
American Western (genre) films
1949 Western (genre) films
RKO Pictures films
American black-and-white films
Films directed by Lesley Selander
1940s American films